In the U.S. state of New Mexico, a frontage road is a usually unsigned, but sometimes signed, highway assigned and maintained by the New Mexico Department of Transportation (NMDOT). The majority of them are minor connectors between two signed routes.

FR 1035

Frontage Road 1035 is a  frontage road. The highway begins at NM 404 in Anthony and heads north to a junction with Union Avenue in Mesquite. It is the fifth longest Frontage Road.

FR 1036

FR 1043

Frontage Road 1043 is a  frontage road. The highway begins at the Texas state line west of I-10 and heads north to NM 404.

FR 2044
Frontage Road 2044 is a  frontage road. The highway begins at the former NM 408 and heads north to a junction with FR 2051 at exit 163 of Interstate 25 (I-25).

FR 2051
Frontage Road 2051 is a  frontage road. The highway begins at FR 2044 at exit 163 of I-25 and heads north to the end of state maintenance.

FR 2108 

Frontage Road 2108  begins at U.S. Route 285 and New Mexico State Road 300.

FR 2115 

Frontage Road 2115 is a  frontage road. The highway begins at FR 2116 and then intersects exit of I-25 and heads north to end at NM 63.

FR 2116
Frontage Road 2116 is a  frontage road. FR 2116's western terminus is a continuation of Cactus Drive west of Rowe, and the eastern terminus is at Interstate 25 (I-25), U.S. Route 84 (US 84), and US 85. Along the way FR 2116 intersects NM 34 east of Rowe and then NM 3 north of Ribera. FR 2116 is the second longest frontage road.

FR 2117
Frontage Road 2117 is a  frontage road.

FR 2120
Frontage Road 2120 is a  frontage road located west of Ilfield. FR 2120's southern terminus is at FR 2116 and the eastern terminus is a continuation as FR 2121 east.

FR 2121
Frontage Road 2121 is a  frontage road. FR 2121's western terminus is a continuation of FR 2120 west of Ilfield and the eastern terminus is at the end of route near Ilfield.

FR 2122
Frontage Road 2122 is a  frontage road west of Sands. FR 2122's western terminus is at the end of route and the eastern terminus is at FR 2116.

FR 2123
Frontage Road 2123 is a  frontage road. FR 2123's western terminus is at FR 2116, and the eastern terminus is at the end of route.

FR 2125
Frontage Road 2125 is a  frontage road north of San Jose. FR 2125's western terminus is at FR 2116, and the eastern terminus is at the end of route. FR 2125 is the main road into San Jose

FR 2126
Frontage Road 2126 is a  frontage road east of San Jose. FR 2126's southern terminus is at the right of way fence on the south side of I-25, and the northern terminus is at the right of way fence on the north side of I-25.

FR 2128
Frontage Road 2128 is a  frontage road east of San Jose. FR 2128's western terminus is at the end of state maintenance, and the eastern terminus is at FR 2116.

FR 2129
Frontage Road 2129 is a  frontage road in Bernal. FR 2129's southern terminus is at the end of state maintenance, and the northern terminus is at FR 2116.

FR 2130
Frontage Road 2130 is a  frontage road north of Bernal. FR 2130's western terminus is at FR 2116, and the eastern terminus is at the end of state maintenance.

FR 2131
Frontage Road 2131 is a  frontage road north of Bernal. FR 2131's western terminus is at FR 2116, and the eastern terminus is at the end of state maintenance.

FR 2132
Frontage Road 2132 is a  frontage road south of Tecolote. FR 2132's western terminus is at FR 2116, and the eastern terminus is at the end of state maintenance.

FR 2134
Frontage Road 2134 is a  frontage road in Tecolote. FR 2123's western terminus is at FR 2116, and the eastern terminus is at FR 2135.

FR 2135
Frontage Road 2135 is a  frontage road in Tecolote. FR 2135's southern terminus is at FR 2134, and the northern terminus is at the end of route.

FR 2136
Frontage Road 2136 is a  frontage road north of Tecolote. FR 2136's western terminus is at FR 2116, and the eastern terminus is at Cedar Hill Road.

FR 2151
Frontage Road 2151 is a  frontage road. The southern terminus is at NM 161 east of I-25 exit 366, north of Watrous. The northern terminus is at I-25 Bus. south of Springer. FR 2151 was the former routing of a section of US 85, and is the longest Frontage Road in New Mexico.

FR 2165
Frontage Road 2165 is a  frontage road. The southern terminus is at NM 468 and the northern terminus is the end of route by I-25 exit 419.

FR 2523
Frontage Road 2523 is a  frontage road. The southern terminus is at Coal Avenue east of I-25 exit 366, in Albuquerque. The northern terminus is at NM 556 in Albuquerque. FR 2523 is a one-way northbound road.

FR 2537
Frontage Road 2537 is a  frontage road. The northern terminus is at NM 556 in Albuquerque. The southern terminus is at Central Avenue west of I-25 exit 366, in Albuquerque. FR 2537 is a one-way southbound road.

FR 4026
Frontage Road 4026 is a  frontage road. The eastern terminus is at University Avenue at the I-40 exit 366 westbound off ramp, in Albuquerque. The western terminus is at 4th Street at the I-40 exit 158 westbound on ramp in Albuquerque. FR 4026 is a one-way westbound road.

FR 4029
Frontage Road 4029 is a  frontage road. The western terminus is at 4th Street at the I-40 exit 158 eastbound off ramp, in Albuquerque. The eastern terminus is at University Avenue at the I-40 exit 159 eastbound on ramp in Albuquerque. FR 4029 is a one-way eastbound road.

See also
 List of state roads in New Mexico

References

Frontage
Transportation in New Mexico